Stellar engineering is a type of engineering (currently a form of exploratory engineering) concerned with creating or modifying stars through artificial means.

While humanity does not yet possess the technological ability to perform stellar engineering of any kind, stellar manipulation (or husbandry), requiring substantially less technological advancement than would be needed to create a new star, could eventually be performed in order to stabilize or prolong the lifetime of a star, mine it for useful material (known as star lifting) or use it as a direct energy source. Since a civilization advanced enough to be capable of manufacturing a new star would likely have vast material and energy resources at its disposal, it almost certainly wouldn't need to do so.

In science fiction
Many science fiction authors have explored the possible applications of stellar engineering, among them Iain M Banks, Larry Niven and Arthur C. Clarke.

In the novel series Star Carrier by Ian Douglas the Sh’daar species merge many stars to make blue giants, which then explode to become black holes. These perfectly synchronized black holes form a Tipler cylinder called the Texagu Resh gravitational anomaly. 

In the novel series The Book of The New Sun by Gene Wolfe, the brightness of Urth's sun seems to have been reduced by artificial means.

In the season 3 (1989) episode "Take Me to Your Leader" of the 1987 Teenage Mutant Ninja Turtles cartoon, Krang, Shredder, Bebop and Rocksteady use a Solar Siphon to aim towards the Sun, and store the solar energy into compact batteries, freezing the Earth making it too cold for people to resist them.

In episode 12 of Stargate Universe, Destiny was dropped prematurely out of FTL by an uncharted star that the crew determines to be artificially created and younger than 200 million years old with an Earth-sized planet containing a biosphere exactly like Earth's being the only planet in the system.

In Firefly (TV series), set 500 years in the future, several gas giants are "Helioformed" to create viable suns for the surrounding planets and moons.

In the Space Empires series the last available technology for research is called Stellar Manipulation. In addition to the ability to create and destroy stars, this branch also gives a race the ability to create and destroy black holes, wormholes, nebulae, planets, ringworlds and sphereworlds. Just as described above, this technology is so advanced that once the player has the ability to use them, they usually don't need them anymore. This is even more the case with the last two; once one of these megastructures is complete, the race controlling the ringworld or sphereworld has almost unlimited resources, usually leading to defeat of the others.

In The Saga of the Seven Suns, by Kevin J. Anderson, humans are able to convert gas giant planets into stars through the use of a "Klikiss Torch". This device creates a wormhole between two points in space, allowing a neutron star to be dropped into the planet and ignite stellar nuclear fusion.

See also

References

Exploratory engineering
Fictional technology
Engineering